The N58 road is a national secondary road in Ireland. It links the N26 national primary road at Foxford in Co Mayo to the N5 national primary road at Bellavary, 11km to the south. As such it forms part of the main route linking the three largest towns in Co Mayo - Castlebar and Westport on the N5 and Ballina on the N26.

Route
Foxford (N26) – (N5 between Swinford and Castlebar)

See also
Roads in Ireland 
Motorways in Ireland
National primary road
Regional road

References
Roads Act 1993 (Classification of National Roads) Order 2006 – Department of Transport

National secondary roads in the Republic of Ireland
Roads in County Mayo